Exile is primarily penal expulsion from one's native country, and secondarily expatriation or prolonged absence from one's homeland under either the compulsion of circumstance or the rigors of some high purpose. Usually persons and peoples suffer exile, but sometimes social entities like institutions (e.g. the papacy or a government) are forced from their homeland.

In Roman law, exsilium denoted both voluntary exile and banishment as a capital punishment alternative to death. Deportation was forced exile, and entailed the lifelong loss of citizenship and property. Relegation was a milder form of deportation, which preserved the subject's citizenship and property.

The term diaspora describes group exile, both voluntary and forced. "Government in exile" describes a government of a country that has relocated and argues its legitimacy from outside that country. Voluntary exile is often depicted as a form of protest by the person who claims it, to avoid persecution and prosecution (such as tax or criminal allegations), an act of shame or repentance, or isolating oneself to be able to devote time to a particular pursuit.

Article 9 of the Universal Declaration of Human Rights states that "No one shall be subjected to arbitrary arrest, detention or exile."

For individuals

Exiled heads of state 

In some cases the deposed head of state is allowed to go into exile following a coup or other change of government, allowing a more peaceful transition to take place or to escape justice.

Avoiding tax or legal matters 

A wealthy citizen who moves to a jurisdiction with lower taxes is termed a tax exile. Creative people such as authors and musicians who achieve sudden wealth sometimes choose this. Examples include the British-Canadian writer Arthur Hailey, who moved to the Bahamas to avoid taxes following the runaway success of his novels Hotel and Airport, and the English rock band the Rolling Stones who, in the spring of 1971, owed more in taxes than they could pay and left Britain before the government could seize their assets. Members of the band all moved to France for a period of time where they recorded music for the album that came to be called Exile on Main Street, the Main Street of the title referring to the French Riviera. In 2012, Eduardo Saverin, one of the founders of Facebook, made headlines by renouncing his U.S. citizenship before his company's IPO. The dual Brazilian/U.S. citizen's decision to move to Singapore and renounce his citizenship spurred a bill in the U.S. Senate, the Ex-PATRIOT Act, which would have forced such wealthy tax exiles to pay a special tax in order to re-enter the United States.

In some cases a person voluntarily lives in exile to avoid legal issues, such as litigation or criminal prosecution. An example of this is Asil Nadir, who fled to the Turkish Republic of Northern Cyprus for 17 years rather than face prosecution in connection with the failed £1.7 bn company Polly Peck in the United Kingdom.

Avoiding violence or persecution, or in the aftermath of war 
Examples include:
 Iraqi academics asked to return home "from exile" to help rebuild Iraq in 2009
 Jews who fled persecution from Nazi Germany
 People undertaking a religious or civil liberties role in society may be forced into exile due to threat of persecution. For example, nuns were exiled following the Communist coup d'état of 1948 in Czechoslovakia.

Euphemism for convict 
Exile, government man and assigned servant were all euphemisms used in the 19th century for convicts under sentence who had been transported from Britain to Australia.

For groups, nations and governments

Comfortable exile 

Comfortable exile is an alternative theory recently developed by anthropologist Binesh Balan in 2018. According to him, comfortable exile is a "social exile of people who have been excluded from the mainstream society. Such people are considered 'aliens' or internal 'others' on the grounds of their religious, racial, ethnic, linguistic or caste-based identity and therefore they migrate to a comfortable space elsewhere after having risked their lives to restore representation, identity and civil rights in their own country and often capture a comfortable identity to being part of a dominant religion, society or culture."

Nation in exile 

When a large group, or occasionally a whole people or nation is exiled, it can be said that this nation is in exile, or "diaspora". Nations that have been in exile for substantial periods include the Jews, who were deported by Babylonian king Nebuchadnezzar II in 586 BC and again following the destruction of the second Temple in Jerusalem in AD 70. Many Jewish prayers include a yearning to return to Jerusalem and the Jewish homeland.

After the partitions of Poland in the late 18th century, and following the uprisings (like Kościuszko Uprising, November Uprising and January Uprising) against the partitioning powers (Russia, Prussia and Austria), many Poles have chosen – or been forced – to go into exile, forming large diasporas (known as Polonia), especially in France and the United States. The entire population of Crimean Tatars (numbering 200,000 in all) that remained in their homeland of Crimea was exiled on 18 May 1944 to Central Asia as a form of ethnic cleansing and collective punishment on false accusations.

Since the Cuban Revolution, over a million Cubans have left Cuba. Most of these self-identified as exiles as their motivation for leaving the island is political in nature. At the time of the Cuban Revolution, Cuba only had a population of 6.5 million, and was not a country that had a history of significant emigration, it being the sixth largest recipient of immigrants in the world as of 1958. Most of the exiles' children also consider themselves to be Cuban exiles. Under Cuban law, children of Cubans born abroad are considered Cuban citizens.

Government in exile 

During a foreign occupation or after a coup d'état, a government in exile of a such afflicted country may be established abroad. One of the most well-known instances of this is the Polish government-in-exile, a government in exile that commanded Polish armed forces operating outside Poland after German occupation during World War II. Other examples include the Free French Forces government of Charles de Gaulle of the same time, and the Central Tibetan Administration, commonly known as the Tibetan government-in-exile, and headed by the 14th Dalai Lama.

For inanimate objects 

Ivan the Terrible once exiled to Siberia an inanimate object: a bell.  "When the inhabitants of the town of Uglich rang their bell to rally a demonstration against Ivan the Terrible, the cruel Czar executed two hundred (nobles), and exiled the Uglich bell to Siberia, where it remained for two hundred years."

In popular culture

Drama 

Exile is an early motif in ancient Greek tragedy. In the ancient Greek world, this was seen as a fate worse than death. The motif reaches its peak on the play Medea, written by Euripides in the fifth century BC, and rooted in the very old oral traditions of Greek mythology. Euripides' Medea has remained the most frequently performed Greek tragedy through the 20th century.

Art 

After Medea was abandoned by Jason and had become a murderess out of revenge, she fled to Athens and married king Aigeus there, and became the stepmother of the hero Theseus. Due to a conflict with him, she must leave the Polis and go away into exile. John William Waterhouse (1849–1917), the English Pre-Raphaelite painter's famous picture Jason and Medea shows a key moment before, when Medea tries to poison Theseus.

Literature 
In ancient Rome, the Roman Senate had the power to declare the exile to individuals, families or even entire regions. One of the Roman victims was the poet Ovid, who lived during the reign of Augustus. He was forced to leave Rome and move away to the city of Tomis on the Black Sea, now Constanta. There he wrote his famous work Tristia (Sorrows) about his bitter feelings in exile.
Another, at least in a temporary exile, was Dante.

The German-language writer Franz Kafka described the exile of Karl Rossmann in the posthumously published novel Amerika.

During the period of National Socialism in the first few years after 1933, many Jews, as well as a significant number of German artists and intellectuals fled into exile; for instance, the authors Klaus Mann and Anna Seghers. So Germany's own exile literature emerged and received worldwide credit. Klaus Mann finished his novel  (The Volcano. A Novel Among Emigrants) in 1939 describing the German exile scene, "to bring the rich, scattered and murky experience of exile into epic form", as he wrote in his literary balance sheet. At the same place and in the same year, Anna Seghers published her famous novel Das siebte Kreuz (The Seventh Cross, published in the United States in 1942).

Important exile literatures in recent years include that of the Caribbean, many of whose artists emigrated to Europe or the United States for political or economic reasons. These writers include Nobel Prize winners V. S. Naipaul and Derek Walcott as well as the novelists Edwidge Danticat and Sam Selvon.

See also 
 Banishment in the Torah
 Ban (law)
 Defection
 Émigré
 Minus six – form of exile in the Soviet Union
 Ostracism – procedure under the Athenian democracy
 Outlawry
 Penal colony
 Petalism
 Porcian Laws, the Roman laws granting citizens the right to voluntary exile in place of capital punishment
 Refugee
 Right of asylum (political asylum)
 Shimanagashi
 :Category:Exiles by nationality

References

External links 

 Without a Country Varied experiences of American and British exiles in the 20th century.
 
 

 
Punishments
Literary motifs